David or Dave Carter may refer to:

Arts and entertainment
David A. Carter (born 1957), American author and illustrator of pop-up books
David E. Carter, author who has written over 100 books on graphic design, logo design, and corporate branding
Dave Carter (1952–2002), American folk singer, songwriter

Fictional characters
Dave Carter (EastEnders), character on the British TV series EastEnders
David Carter (character), protagonist of the 1998 American TV series Invasion America

Politics and government
David Carter (diplomat) (born 1945), retired British diplomat
David Carter (politician) (born 1952), New Zealand politician
David O. Carter (born 1944), United States District Court judge
David J. Carter (born 1934), politician, clergyman, photographer and author from Alberta, Canada

Sports
David Carter (offensive lineman) (1953–2021), American football offensive lineman
David Carter (defensive lineman) (born 1987),  American football defensive lineman
David Carter (basketball) (born 1967), American college basketball coach
David Carter (bridge), American bridge player
David Carter (field hockey) (born 1981), Canadian field hockey player
David Carter (golfer) (born 1972), English golfer
David Carter (tennis) (born 1956), Australian former tennis player
Dave Carter (powerlifter) (born 1947), British powerlifter

Others
David Carter (industrial designer) (1927–2020), industrial designer and educator
David Carter (surgeon) (born 1940), surgeon who was Chief Medical Officer for Scotland